Binniehill is a village in Falkirk, Scotland. The name is a tautology, with "binnie" coming from Scottish Gaelic "binnean" meaning a small hill.

External links

Canmore - Binniehill Colliery site record

Villages in Falkirk (council area)